Putalabai Bhosale was the third queen of the Maratha king Shivaji. She was from Palkar Family and married Shivaji in 1653. Putalabai was the oldest of the surviving wives of Shivaji, and had no children. She committed Sati after the death of Shivaji.

In Popular Culture

Samira Gujar portrayed Putulabai in popular Tv series Raja Shivchhatrapati

Smita Shewale portrayed Putulabai in Veer Shivaji

Pallavi Vaidya played Putulabai in Swarajyarakshak Sambhaji

Saayali Sunil plays Putulabai in Swarajya Janani Jijamata

References

Indian female royalty
Women of the Maratha Empire
Suicides in India
17th-century Indian women
17th-century Indian people